Barbaise is a commune in the Ardennes department in the Grand Est region of northern France.

Geography
Barbaise is located at an altitude of 209 metres some 16 km south-west of Charleville-Mézières and 30 km north-east of Rethel. Access to the commune is by the D3 road from Jandun in the east which passes through the centre of the commune and continues north-east to Warnécourt. Access to the village is by the D203 which branches off the D3 in the commune and goes south to the village. The commune is mostly farmland with forests in the north-east and north of the commune.

The Ruisseau de Barbileuse rises in the village and flows south to join the Vence south-west of Raillicourt.

Neighbouring communes and villages

Administration

List of Successive Mayors

Demography
In 2017 the commune had 101 inhabitants.

Sites and monuments

The Church of Barbaise contains three items that are registered as historical objects:
A Celebrant's Chair (17th century)
A Statue: Christ on the Cross (16th century)
A Group Sculpture: Saint Anne instructing the Virgin (15th century)

See also
Communes of the Ardennes department

References

External links
Barbaise on Géoportail, National Geographic Institute (IGN) website 
Barbaize on the 1750 Cassini Map

Communes of Ardennes (department)